Hinea longispira is a species of sea snail, a marine gastropod mollusk in the family Planaxidae.

Distribution
This marine species occurs off Japan.

References

External links
 Smith, E. A. (1872). A list of the species of the genus Planaxis, with descriptions of eleven new species. Annals and Magazine of Natural History. ser. 4, 9: 37-47
 Dall, W. H. (1926). New shells from Japan and the Loochoo Islands. Proceedings of the Biological Society of Washington. 39: 63-66

Planaxidae
Gastropods described in 1872
Marine gastropods